Droshak (Troshag, "Flag") is the official organ of the Armenian Revolutionary Federation (ARF) published in Tiflis (1890), Balkans (1890s), Geneva (1892-1914), Paris (1925-33), Beirut (1969-85), Athens (1986-96), Yerevan (since 1999). It was first published in 1890 by ARF founder Christapor Mikaelian as a monthly, then as a bi-monthly, bi-weekly, and weekly. Initially published as an illegal newspaper in Tiflis (Tbilisi) in the Russian Empire, it was established as a legal publication in Geneva in 1892, where it continued to be published until 1914, when publication was ended due to the start of the First World War.  Its primary subject was the ideological questions of the party and the Armenian national liberation movement. It resumed publication in Paris in 1925 until ending again in 1933. During this period, the paper dealt with political and ideological questions regarding the situation in Soviet Armenia (where the ARF was banned) and debates between communism and socialism. It was reestablished as a weekly in Beirut in 1969 and was moved to Athens in 1986 (where it was published bi-weekly) after the kidnapping of its editor Sarkis Zeitlian. Droshak's editorial board returned to Lebanon in 1996, but publication continued in Athens. After officially registering Droshak in the Republic of Armenia in 1999, the editorial board and publication moved to Yerevan. Since then, it has been released in print on a quarterly basis and makes weekly electronic publications.

Editors:
Christapor Mikaelian
Rostom (Stepan Zorian)
Honan Davtian
Mikael Varandian
Simon Vratsian
Babgen Papazian
Sarkis Zeitlian
Nazareth Berberian
Karen Khanlarian 
Artashes Shahbazian

and others.

References

External links
Droshak Journal's page
Electronic archive of Droshak provided by the National Library of Armenia

Armenian journals